The following highways are numbered 25A:

Canada

 Prince Edward Island Route 25A

United States
 Florida State Road 25A
 County Road 25A (Alachua County, Florida)
 County Road 25A (Columbia County, Florida)
 County Road 25A (Hamilton County, Florida)
 County Road 25A (Lake County, Florida)
 County Road 25A (Marion County, Florida)
Maryland Route 25A
 Nebraska Highway 25A
 Nebraska Link 25A
 Nevada State Route 25A (former)
 New Jersey Route 25A (former)
 New York State Route 25A
  Vermont Route 25A / New Hampshire Route 25A